Buenaventura Sitjar (born 9 December 1739 in Porreres, Majorca – died 3 September 1808 at San Antonio, California) was a Franciscan missionary who served in California until his death.

He became a monk in April, 1758, joining the College of San Fernando de Mexico. In 1770 he received orders to go to California, and he reached San Diego on 21 May 1771.

He helped found Mission San Antonio de Padua and served there until his death on 3 September 1808. During his tenure, 3400 Indians were baptized. He became fluent in their language, a Salinan language called Antoniaño, Telamé, or Sextapay (after its location). With the assistance of Father Miguel Pieras, he wrote a dictionary translating the language into Spanish. Although the list of words is not as long as Felipe Arroyo de la Cuesta's dictionary of 2884 words and sentences in the Mutsun idiom of Mission San Juan Bautista, Sitjar's gives the pronunciation and fuller explanations. This work forms the seventh volume of John G. Shea's Library of American Linguistics (New York, 1861), and was published separately under the title of Vocabulary of the Language of the San Antonio Missions (1863).

He also left a journal of an exploring expedition which he accompanied in 1795. In 1797, he participated in the founding of Mission San Miguel Arcángel. His body was buried in the Mission San Antonio sanctuary.

Notes

References
 
 
 Sitjar, Fr. Buenaventura (1861) Vocabulario de la lengua de los naturales de la mission de San Antonio, Alta California. Shea's Library of American Linguistics, 7. Reprinted 1970 at New York by AMS Press.

Spanish Roman Catholic missionaries
People from Mallorca
Priests of the Spanish missions in California
1739 births
1808 deaths
Roman Catholic missionaries in New Spain
Linguists of Salinan
Missionary linguists